Alfred William Howitt , (17 April 1830 – 7 March 1908), also known by author abbreviation A.W. Howitt, was an Australian anthropologist, explorer and naturalist. He was known for leading the Victorian Relief Expedition, which set out to establish the fate of the ill-fated Burke and Wills expedition.

Life

Howitt was born in Nottingham, England, the son of authors William Howitt and Mary Botham.

He went to the Victorian gold fields in 1852 with his father and brother to visit his uncle, Godfrey Howitt.  Initially, Howitt was a geologist in Victoria; later, he worked as a gold warden in North Gippsland. Howitt went on to be appointed Police magistrate & Warden Crown Lands Commissioner; later still, he held the position of Secretary of the Mines Department.

In 1861, the Royal Society of Victoria appointed Howitt leader of the Victorian Relief Expedition, with the task of establishing the fate of the Burke and Wills expedition. Howitt was a skilled bushman; he took only the necessary equipment and a small crew on the journey to Cooper Creek. There, on 16 September he found sole survivor John King; Howitt buried Burke and Wills before returning to Melbourne with King. On a follow-up expedition to Cooper Creek in 1862, Howitt recovered the bodies of Burke and Wills for burial at the Melbourne General Cemetery.

Howitt collected botanical specimens during his expeditions in north-eastern South Australia, south-western Queensland and western New South Wales; his collections were sent to Baron von Mueller and are now in Melbourne.

Howitt researched the culture and society of Indigenous Australians, in particular kinship and marriage; he was influenced by the theories of evolution and anthropology. Howitt's major work (co-authored with Lorimer Fison) was "Kamilaroi and Kurnai" (1879), which was recognised internationally as a landmark in the development of the modern science of anthropology; this work was used by others, including the twentieth century anthropologist Norman Tindale.

In 1863 he married Maria (nickname 'Liney') Boothby; they had five children. Maria was the daughter of Judge Benjamin Boothby, Chief Justice of the Colony of South Australia. 
Howitt was Secretary for Mines in Victoria.

In 1903 Howitt was awarded the Clarke Medal by the Royal Society of New South Wales; in 1904 he received the first Mueller Medal from the Royal Society of Victoria. A memorial fund established after his death was used to buy rare books on topics such as anthropology, geology, and botany for the library of the Royal Society; these books were inscribed "Purchased from A. W. Howitt Memorial Fund". He was appointed CMG in the 1906 Birthday Honours.

Howitt died in 1908 in Bairnsdale, Victoria. The recreational park named in his honour is located adjacent to the Mitchell River Bridge on the eastern side of Bairnsdale.

Howitt's scientific life shared a special irony with that of his longtime friend Lorimer Fison. They were both set in motion by Lewis Henry Morgan; Morgan pinned more hope on Fison than on Howitt. However, Fison gave up his scientific pursuit shortly after Morgan's death, whereas Howitt persevered for many years. Howitt's magnum opus, The Native Tribes of South East Australia (1904), remains one of the only contemporaneous scientific studies of the native institutions of Central Australian Aborigines.

Recognition
Mount Howitt in Victoria, and Howitt Hall, one of Monash University's Halls of Residence are named after him. Howitt Street in Kingston Canberra, Howitt street in Traralgon and a major street in Porsche suburb of Kingston is also named after him. It is likely that Howitt, a locality beside the Gulf of Carpentaria in Queensland, is named after him as many localities in the area are named after those connected to the Burke and Wills expedition.

References

Howitt, Alfred William, 1870, 15 March 1870. "Experiences in Central Australia". Gippsland Times.
Howitt, Alfred William, 1878. "Notes on the Aborigines of Coopers Creek". In R. B. Smyth (Ed.), The Aborigines of Victoria.
Howitt, Alfred William, 1889. "Note as to descent in the Dieri tribe". Journal of the Anthropological Institute. Vol. 19, p. 90.
Howitt, Alfred William, 1890. "The Dieri and other kindred tribes of Central Australia". Journal of the Anthropological Institute. Vol. 20, pp. 30–104.
 
Howitt, Alfred William, 1898. "Reminiscences of Central Australia". Alma Mater. Vol. 3 (No. 1).
 
Howitt, Alfred William, 1907. "Personal reminiscences of Central Australia and the Burke and Wills Expedition: Presidents inaugural address". Journal of the Australasian Association for the Advancement of Science. 1907  (Adelaide, 1907.), 43p.
Howitt, Alfred William, Royal Anthropological Institute of Great Britain and Ireland, & Siebert Otto, 1904. Legends of the Dieri and kindred tribes of Central Australia. London: Anthropological Institute of Great Britain and Ireland.

External links

 
State Library of Victoria biography
Bright Sparcs biographical entry
Brief biograph including photo
Terra Incognita Burke and Wills online exhibition at the State Library of Victoria.
Burke & Wills Web A comprehensive website containing many of the historical documents relating to the Burke & Wills Expedition.
The Burke & Wills Historical Society The Burke & Wills Historical Society.
Kamilaroi and Kurnai book details, 

Australian anthropologists
19th-century Australian botanists
Australian Companions of the Order of St Michael and St George
Australian explorers
Australian public servants
Burials in Victoria (Australia)
1830 births
1908 deaths
People from Nottingham
English emigrants to colonial Australia